Geofilum rhodophaeum is a Gram-positive and facultatively anaerobic bacterium from the genus of Geofilum which has been isolated from sediments from the coast of Weihai in China.

References

External links
Type strain of Geofilum rhodophaeum at BacDive -  the Bacterial Diversity Metadatabase

Bacteria described in 2017
Bacteroidia